This article displays the rosters for the participating teams at the 2015 FIBA CBC Championship. The player ages are as of  June 15, which was the first day of the tournament.

Group A

British Virgin Islands

Cayman Islands

St. Vincent and the Grenadines

Group B

Bermuda

Guyana

References

External links 
ARCHIVE.FIBA.COM

FIBA CBC Championship squads
2015 in Central American sport